Yue Qifeng (December 1931 – March 24, 2008) was a People's Republic of China politician. He was born in Daming County, Hebei Province. In January 1945, at the age of 13, he joined the Chinese Communist Party. He was governor of his home province (1990).

References 

1931 births
2008 deaths
People's Republic of China politicians from Hebei
Chinese Communist Party politicians from Hebei
Governors of Hebei
Governors of Liaoning
CCP committee secretaries of Heilongjiang